Rohan Pramod Kadam (born 5 July 1994) is an Indian cricketer who represents Karnataka in domestic cricket. He made his List A debut for Karnataka in the 2016–17 Vijay Hazare Trophy on 6 March 2017. He made his Twenty20 debut for Karnataka in the 2018–19 Syed Mushtaq Ali Trophy on 21 February 2019. He was the leading run-scorer in the 2018–19 Syed Mushtaq Ali Trophy, with 536 runs in twelve matches. He made his first-class debut on 3 January 2020, for Karnataka in the 2019–20 Ranji Trophy.

References

External links

 

1994 births
Living people
Indian cricketers
Karnataka cricketers
People from Dharwad